The R578 is a 100 km long Regional Route in South Africa.

The construction of the large section of the road, from Elim to Giyani (84 km of the Road) was surveyed, planned and constructed by the former Gazankulu Government in 1987. The R578 runs through the Tsonga homeland of former Gazankulu, in particular, it runs through Hlanganani and Giyani.The following villages, which are large and densely populated, are found alongside the R578 road; Elim, Rivoni, Waterval, Shirley, Mbhokota, Bokisi, Chavani, Nwaxinyamani, Bungeni, Nkuzana, Majosi, Nwamatatana, Khomanani, Ntshuxi, the Middle Letaba Dam, Babangu, Ndengeza C, Nhlaneki, Mapuve, Maswanganyi, Bode, Dzingidzingi and join Giyani at R81. Elim Hospital, Hubyeni Shopping Centre and Elim Mall are all situated alongside the R578 road. In 2014, the South African Cabinet has announced that the maintenance of R578 will be undertaken by the South African National Roads Agency (SANRAL), it is expected that R578 will receive first class maintenance from SANRAL, therefore potholes between Elim and Giyani will disappear.

Route
Its western terminus is the N1 just south of Louis Trichardt, it heads east-south-east, through the township of Waterval at Elim to end at Giyani at an intersection with the R81.

References

Regional Routes in Limpopo